Adetus pictoides is a species of beetle in the family Cerambycidae. It was described by Breuning in 1973.

References

Adetus
Beetles described in 1973